The Yerba Buena Steam Tram (nicknamed Trencito or La Chorbita) was a  long  gauge railway in the city of Yerba Buena in Tucumán Province. It was inaugurated on 29 June 1916 during the Centennial of the Argentine Independence and was shut down a decade later in 1926.

Opening 
On November 15, 1915, a law was passed that allowed the Executive Power of Tucumán (at the time, Governor Ernesto Padilla) to create a freight and passenger rail line to connect San Miguel de Tucumán with the cities of Los Cuarteles, Villa Luján (también llamada Villa del Pueblo Nuevo), Villa Marcos Paz, Yerba Buena, and Parque Aconquija.

The initiative was known as "Tranvía Rural" and the service was opened to the public on June 29, 1916.

Route

The railway started at Plaza Alberdi (the square at the Central Argentine Railway station) and ran west on Calle Santiago del Estero, turned right into Avenida Mitre and followed it until they turned left into Avenida Manuel Belgrano. Here it passed the depot and the workshops. It ran west to the Avenida Ejército del Norte, then turned south along Calle Córdoba (now Calle Don Bosco). On the Calle Aconquija (now Calle Luis Federico Nougués) it ran to the Avenida Mate de Luna, which it followed to the terminus Horco Molle at today's El Corte roundabout at the foot of the San Javier Hill.

Operation

Trains ran 6 to 8 times a day. It was colloquially called "Trencito" (little train) or "La Chorbita" (choo choo train). A single trip along the lone took between 45 minutes and one hour. The stations were numbered; some of these numbers are still used colloquially today.

Trains ran on Decauville tracks, that had been also used in the Ferrocarril Económico Correntino, and nowadays in the Rainforest Ecological Train in Iguazú National Park. The locals preferred not to take the train because sparks from the locomotive often fell into the open carriages, damaging clothes.

The rolling stock included four or five steam locomotives and eight passenger and freight wagons. The workshops were located on Avenida Belgrano and Calle Asunción. Although a total of 135,505 passengers had been carried by 1925, the line closed in 1926 due to a lack of profitability.

References

External links 

 Fotos y postales de Trenes y Tranvías de Tucumán on Tucumán en Fotos blog

Railway lines in Argentina
Railway lines opened in 1916
Railway lines opened in 1926
y
600 mm gauge railways
y